Mineral Hall in Kansas City, Missouri is a historic building constructed in 1903. An elaborate example of Prairie School architecture by Louis Singleton Curtiss, it originally served as a residence.

Description
The building is located in the residential/mixed South Hyde Park neighborhood of Kansas City. Designed by  noted architect Louis S. Curtiss it reflects a Prairie School practice of combining Second Empire, Art Nouveau and Neoclassical architectural elements. The building is asymmetrical yet almost rectangular with projecting bays on the north, south, west and northwest. The foundation is uncoursed large block and the primary wall material is rock faced Jackson County limestone with a random pattern. The facade is the east side and fronts Oak Street. Features of the facade include a stone veranda and the central main entrance which is approached by seven wide stone steps. The entry arch is ornamented as is the stairway and approach.

History
He bought the building in 1905 after it had been built for William A. Rule. It was a second home in the city for Rule and he never occupied it having had it built "to maintain the quality of the neighborhood". The building and the addition on the north built the next year are important examples of the work of Kansas City architect Louis S. Curtiss. Born in Canada, Curtiss was a notable architect in Kansas City. Construction was supervised by local stone contractor Henry H. Johnson. The building was donated to the Kansas City Art Institute in 1968. It was listed on the National Register of Historic Places on July 12, 1976.

Photo gallery

See also
 Historic preservation
 Mineralogy
 National Register of Historic Places listings in Jackson County, Missouri: Kansas City other
 Stonemasonry

References

External links
 
 
 

Houses on the National Register of Historic Places in Missouri
Prairie School architecture in Missouri
Houses completed in 1903
Houses in Kansas City, Missouri
National Register of Historic Places in Kansas City, Missouri